FX Life (formerly known as Fox Life) is a Greek pay-television channel owned by the Fox Networks Group, which launched on 1 December 2008. The network also broadcasts to Cyprus, doing so since 15 October 2012.

The program includes foreign series such as Grey's Anatomy, This Is Us, and How to Get Away with Murder, with new episodes for the first time in Greece and some reality shows such as MasterChef and Project Runway.

Programmes

Current

Alaska Daily
Big Sky
Blue Bloods
Castle
Chicago Fire
Chicago Med
Donal's Super Food In Minutes
Good Trouble
Grey's Anatomy
Masterchef
Modern Family
Nigella's Cook, Eat, Repeat Christmas Special
Station 19
The King of Queens

See also
Fox Greece
FX Greece
National Geographic Greece
Fox Life

References

External links

Television channels and stations established in 2008
Greek-language television stations
Television channels in Greece
Fox Life